Silke Stokar von Neuforn (born 10 May 1953 in Kleinvollstedt) is a German politician (Greens). She has been a member of the German Parliament since 2002. From 1994 to 2002 she was a member of the Parliament of Lower Saxony. She is divorced and has one daughter.

External links 
 Bundestag biography
 Official website

1953 births
Living people
People from Rendsburg-Eckernförde
Members of the Bundestag for Lower Saxony
Female members of the Bundestag
Members of the Landtag of Lower Saxony
21st-century German women politicians
Members of the Bundestag 2005–2009
Members of the Bundestag 2002–2005
Members of the Bundestag for Alliance 90/The Greens